"Bayou Boys" is a song co-written and recorded by American country music artist Eddy Raven.  It was released in August 1989 as the second single from his album Temporary Sanity.  The song was Raven's sixth and final number one on the country chart.  The single went to number one for one week and spent fourteen weeks on the country chart.  It was written by Raven, Troy Seals and Frank J. Myers.

Chart performance

Year-end charts

References

1989 singles
Eddy Raven songs
Songs written by Troy Seals
Songs written by Frank J. Myers
Songs written by Eddy Raven
Song recordings produced by Barry Beckett
1989 songs
Universal Records (1988) singles